Echolocations: Canyon is an instrumental album by American violinist Andrew Bird and is his ninth solo studio album. It was recorded inside the Coyote Gulch canyons of Utah, and is intended as the first in a five-part Echolocations series. Echolocations: River was released October 6, 2017, and there are plans for City, Lake, and Forest installments.

Critical reception
Most critics acknowledged the experimental nature of Echolocations: Canyon. Sputnikmusic gave the album a rating of 3.5/5, and wrote that "if you enjoy music that symbolizes nature and even incorporates sonic elements of it in the recording, you will find this album to be amazingly transcendental."

Track listing

References

2015 albums
Andrew Bird albums